Vigaña is one of 28 parishes (administrative divisions) in the municipality of Grado, within the province and autonomous community of Asturias, in northern Spain. 

The population is 28 (INE 2007).

References

Parishes in Grado